Albert Town may refer to:
 Albert Town, Bahamas on Long Cay
 Albert Town, Jamaica; see Roads in Jamaica
 Albert Town, Malta 
 Albert Town, New Zealand
 Albert Town, Pembrokeshire, Wales